Peter Whiteman (born 15 May 1944) is a Trinidadian cricketer. He played in two first-class matches for Trinidad and Tobago in 1968/69.

See also
 List of Trinidadian representative cricketers

References

External links
 

1944 births
Living people
Trinidad and Tobago cricketers